An examination board (or exam board) is  small board organization that sets examinations, is responsible for marking them, and distributes results. Some are run by governmental entities;  some are run as not-for-profit organizations.

List of national examination boards

Australia

 Examinations in Australia are set by individual state authorities.
 In Victoria, examinations are set by the Victorian Curriculum and Assessment Authority.
 In South Australia, examinations are set by the SACE Board of SA, which also administers the South Australian Matriculation in certain schools in Malaysia and China.
 In New South Wales, examinations are set by the New South Wales Education Standards Authority.

Hong Kong

 Hong Kong Examinations and Assessment Authority is responsible for the Hong Kong Diploma of Secondary Education Examination.

Philippines
 The Professional Regulation Commission is the instrument of the Filipino people in securing for the nation a reliable, trustworthy and progressive system of developing professionals whose personal integrity and spiritual values are solid and respected, whose competencies are globally competitive, and whose commitment to serve the Filipino nation and the whole community is strong and steadfast. For a comprehensive database of examination results by the PRC, one may visit the PRC Official Website.

Poland
There is one state run central system of examination boards in Poland called "Centralna Komisja Egzaminacyjna" ("Central Examination Board") established within the new legislation on education issued by Polish parliament in 1998. The central board has eight regional branches called "Okręgowa Komisja Egzaminacyjna" (OKE) - "Regional Examination Board". All primary and secondary schools and other education institutions in a region are served by the regional OKE. Universities are not part of that system. It is allowed by law to sit an exam in other regional board than the home one, but practically it does not happen. 

Each OKE is responsible for the content and administration of the entrance tests to primary schools, Gymnasiums and secondary schools in accordance to the Ministry of Education annual guidelines. Final secondary school examination called Matura (analogous to A Levels) is prepared each year by the Ministry of Education and administered by regional examiners, who are recruited, trained and paid by regional OKE boards. Each regional OKE has an authority to issue an official certificate of an examination.

United Kingdom

England, Wales and Northern Ireland

The members of this list all provide A-Level and GCSE qualifications:

 AQA
 CCEA
 Edexcel (London Examinations)
 OCR
 WJEC
 CIE
Traditionally, schools were restricted to one of a large number of regional examination boards, but now they can use any (though few outside Northern Ireland choose to use the Belfast-based CCEA). Furthermore, a number of boards have merged making a much lower number overall.

Scotland

 SQA (including Advanced Highers, Highers and Nationals)

Singapore

 Singapore Examinations and Assessment Board, which is a statutory board under the Ministry of Education (MOE) of Singapore.

United States

Primary and secondary school tests are generally administered by the state boards of education - or in the case of private schools, private organizations whose affiliations align with those of the school. Tertiary school entrance qualifications and vocational qualifications are provided by other organizations.
 College Board - administers the SAT Reasoning Test, SAT Subject Tests, PSAT/NMSQT, Advanced Placement exams, and College Level Examination Program, developed by the Educational Testing Service
 ACT, Inc - administers the American College Test
 Educational Testing Service - administers the Graduate Record Examination and Test of English as a Foreign Language (TOEFL)
 Law School Admission Council - administers the Law School Admission Test
 Association of American Medical Colleges - administers the Medical College Admission Test
 National Association of State Boards of Accountancy - administers the Uniform Certified Public Accountant Examination, developed and maintained by the American Institute of Certified Public Accountants

Caribbean
 Caribbean Examinations Council (administers various examinations across the Anglophone Caribbean)

Africa

West Africa

Anglophone countries in West Africa: Nigeria, Ghana, Liberia, Sierra Leone, and the Gambia 
 West African Examinations Council (administers the WASSCE)

Cameroon
 Cameroon GCE Board (administers the GCE O and A Levels)

Shereen

Zambia
 Examinations Council of Zambia - sets and conduct examinations and, award certificates to successful candidates.

Zimbabwe
 Zimbabwe School Examinations Council - administers the ZIMSEC GCE Ordinary Level and ZIMSEC GCE Advanced Level Examinations.

Bangladesh
8 Divisional Boards organize 4 board examinations PEC (class 5), JSC (class 8), SSC (secondary) & HSC (higher secondary) under the control of Ministry of Education all over the country.
Students are admitted in colleges based on the result of SSC.
After HSC students get admitted into universities by qualifying admission tests.

India 
  
 Central Board of Secondary Education

National Testing Agency

References

School examinations